Eugene Martin Grant (July 17, 1918 – April 3, 2018) was an American real estate investor, philanthropist  and civic leader. He was the owner of buildings in Manhattan, New York City.

Early life
Eugene M. Grant was born as Eugene Martin Greenberg on July 17, 1918 in Hell's Kitchen in New York City. His father, Samuel Greenberg, had immigrated from Russia as a teenager and later became a real estate investor.

Grant graduated from the City College of New York, the University of Michigan, and the Columbia Law School. During World War II, he served in the United States Army.

Career
Grant began his career by "building housing for returning veterans" with his father's company, Samuel Greenberg & Co. Shortly after, he began investing in real estate with Lionel Bauman. Together, they purchased 88 Central Park West. They subsequently purchased the old Saks building at the corner of 34th Street and Broadway.

In 1962, they purchased St. John's Terminal. He founded his own company, Eugene M. Grant & Co., in 1971. He sold his stake in St. John's Terminal in 2013.

Civic activities
Grant was the chairman of the UJA-Federation of New York and the Jewish Museum. He was a founding member of the board of regents of the Center for Security Policy.

Personal life and death
Grant married Emily Louise Geldsaler, of Toronto. They had three daughters. They resided in Mamaroneck, New York.

Grant died on April 3, 2018 at the age of 99. He was survived by his wife of 68 years, their three daughters (Terry, Andrea and Carolyn), and extended family. His funeral was held on April 5 at the Larchmont Temple in Larchmont, New York.

Awards and honors
Eugene and his wife Emily were recognized among The New Jewish Home's Eight Over Eighty Gala 2014 honorees.

References

1918 births
2018 deaths
American people of Russian-Jewish descent
People from Mamaroneck, New York
City College of New York alumni
University of Michigan alumni
Columbia Law School alumni
Businesspeople from New York City
People from Hell's Kitchen, Manhattan
20th-century American businesspeople
United States Army personnel of World War II